Fallulah (born 6 February 1985) is a Danish-Romanian singer-songwriter and musician. Her given name is Maria Apetri. Following a short dancing career, she entered the music industry and released her debut album in 2010 which peaked at number three in Denmark and went on to be certified platinum.

Early life
Fallulah grew up in Tårnby on Amager island, the southern suburbs of Copenhagen. She attended Kalundborg Gymnasium. Her Danish mother, Lillian Apetri and her Romanian father Nicolae Apetri, were the initiators of the Balkanic folklore dance group Crihalma. Therefore, Fallulah spent much of her childhood on dancing tours in the Balkans and in Eastern Europe. This activity ceased when she lost her father at the age of nine years. They then moved to Jyderup in the north west of Zealand, where Fallulah continued with her dancing. At age 21 she moved to New York to start at the Broadway Dance Center but then moved back to Denmark to focus on music.

Career
Fallulah has been compared to Florence and the Machine, Timur Bairam, Marina and the Diamonds and Bat for Lashes. She performed at the Start! festival and has been featured as "Soundvenue Selected" by the Danish music magazine of the same name. She was national radio station DR P3's "unavoidable" during week 38 in 2009 with her single "I Lay My Head".

On 30 October 2009, she released the theme song for the Danish film Simon and Malou entitled "No Time for Love", written by Bryan Adams and Gretchen Peters under the name Maria Apetri.

Her single "Bridges" was the most played track, from a home artist, on DR P3 in 2010, and on 15 January 2011, Fallulah won the prestigious "P3 Guld" award. Early in 2011, Fallulah had another hit with the song "Out of It", which was played as the intro for the so-called depression comedy Lykke on national Danish television. For several weeks the song was the number one download on Danish iTunes. It was number one on the Danish hit list and on the radio list, ending up earning her a Danish Music Award (a Danish Grammy) in the category "Hit of the Year". 

Her second album Escapism was released 4 February 2013 in Denmark. It was followed by Perfect Tense in February 2016, and in November 2020 she released her fourth full album, All My Eyes Are Open.

Discography

Studio albums

Singles

Other appearances

References

External links
 Official website

1985 births
Living people
Danish  women singer-songwriters
Danish pop singers
Danish people of Romanian descent
Singers from Copenhagen
People from Tårnby Municipality
English-language singers from Denmark